Wyoming Highway 372 (WYO 372) is a  Wyoming State Road, named La Barge Road, located in Sweetwater and Lincoln counties.

Route description
Wyoming Highway 372 begins its southern end at Wyoming Highway 374, west of James Town, near exit 83 of Interstate 80/U.S. Route 30. Highway 372 travels northwesterly, roughly paralleling the Green River, although from a considerable distance. Nearing 21 miles, Highway 374 passes along the western side of the Seedskadee National Wildlife Refuge. Shortly thereafter the western terminus of Wyoming Highway 28 is intersected and acts the main route to Riverton and Lander.
Past WYO 28, Highway 372 continues northwest before turning north for a short stretch to serve Fontenelle, where it then turns west. Leaving Fontenelle, WYO 372 heads southwest and then turns west for the last leg of its trip. WYO 372 reaches U.S. Route 189 southwest of the Fontenelle Reservoir.

History
In 1994, WYO 372 was reconstructed and widened to accommodate additional traffic due to the mining and oil exploration operations north of Green River.

Major intersections

See also

References

External links

 Wyoming State Routes 300-399
 WYO 372 - WYO 374 to WYO 28
 WYO 372 - WYO 28 to US 189

Transportation in Sweetwater County, Wyoming
Transportation in Lincoln County, Wyoming
372